Tina Bay (born 30 May 1973) is a Norwegian cross-country skier, born in Odda. She represented the club Korlevoll IL. She competed in 10 km and in pursuit at the 2002 Winter Olympics in Salt Lake City, Utah.

Cross-country skiing results
All results are sourced from the International Ski Federation (FIS).

Olympic Games

World Championships

a.  Cancelled due to extremely cold weather.

World Cup

Season standings

Team podiums

 1 victory 
 3 podiums

References

External links

1973 births
Living people
People from Hordaland
People from Odda
Norwegian female cross-country skiers
Olympic cross-country skiers of Norway
Cross-country skiers at the 2002 Winter Olympics
Sportspeople from Vestland